James Dunkin was the first and third Advocate Fiscal of Ceylon. He was appointed on 19 February 1801 and held the office until 1802. Dunkin was appointed again  in 1806. He was succeeded by Alexander Johnston.

References

Attorneys General of British Ceylon
Year of birth missing
Year of death missing